Lists of food and beverage topics cover topics related to food and drinks from different points of view.
They include lists of foods, beverages, food preparation tools and equipment, food preparation techniques, cuisines and industrial food preparation and distribution operations including breweries.

Foods
 Lists of foods
 Lists of prepared foods
 Outline of food preparation

Defining terms in beverages and explaining methods of preparation 
 Lists of drinks

Tools and equipment
 List of cooking appliances
 List of food preparation utensils
 List of Japanese cooking utensils
 List of serving utensils
 List of ovens
 List of stoves

Techniques
 List of cooking techniques
 List of culinary knife cuts

Cuisines
 List of cuisines
 Outline of cuisines

Industry
 List of bean-to-bar chocolate manufacturers
 List of chefs
 List of cideries in the United States
 List of dairy product companies in the United States
 List of food companies
 List of bakeries
 List of bakery cafés
 List of doughnut shops
 List of restaurateurs
 List of supermarket chains in the United States
 Lists of restaurants

Breweries
 List of breweries in Australia
 List of breweries in Canada
 List of breweries, wineries, and distilleries in Manitoba
 List of breweries in Quebec
 List of Dutch breweries
 List of breweries in England
 List of breweries in Berkshire
 List of breweries in Birmingham
 List of breweries in Ireland
 List of beers and breweries in Nigeria
 List of breweries in Scotland
 List of breweries in the United States

Others
 Index of organic food articles
 List of brand name food products
 List of cholesterol in foods
 List of countries by milk consumption per capita
 List of countries by tea consumption per capita
 List of dining events
 List of food and beverage museums
 List of food cooperatives
 List of food riots
 List of incidents of cannibalism
 List of websites about food and drink